TransIT Services of Frederick County is a public transportation agency in Frederick County, Maryland, that is operated by the county government.  The agency currently operates 9 Connector bus routes, mostly in the city of Frederick, 5 shuttles, and demand-response for seniors and persons with disabilities. TransIT provides connections to other public transportation services in the region, including the MTA Maryland's routes 204 and 515 commuter bus and MARC Train service. According to the agency's homepage, the service had approximately 909,800 boardings in FY 2012.

TransIT Services is the result of merging the former Trans-Serve Frederick County shuttles and the Frederick City Transit lines.

Connector bus routes operate Monday–Friday, and routes 10–65 also provide Saturday service. The agency does not operate any of its routes on Sunday. Most routes provide weekday peak-hour service (every 30 minutes) in addition to hourly service Monday–Friday.

Fares
In April 2014, the fare for a one-way trip using Transit for the general public was $1.25 with a monthly pass costing $45.00. In June 2014, the one-way trip fare for the general public increased to $1.50. At the same time, the fare for TransIT Plus also increased.

Youth and students do not get a discount on one-way trip fare, but do get a discounted rate of $30.00 for a monthly pass. Seniors and disabled persons have a discounted one-way trip fare of $0.60 and a discounted monthly pass rate of $30.00. Ten trip passes can be purchased for $12.00 for the general population, $8.00 for students and youth, and $5.50 for seniors and disabled persons. Transfers are free, and most routes have timed transfers with other routes at the TransIT Center, which is at the city's downtown MARC rail station.

If the bus needs to deviate from its normal route for a stop, an additional $1.50 is charged to the passenger and 24 hours heads up must be given.

Fleet

TransIT currently has a fleet composing of full length buses for their connector routes as well as cut-away para transit vehicles used for shuttles and TransIT+ services. Currently, the fleet subsets are replaced and returned on average every 14 years, the maximum service life for a bus permitted by Maryland law.

Currency there are 28 buses and 35 para-transit cut-away buses on the active fleet, along with several minivans, and passenger cars used for various TransIT special needs services.

Former fleet
The original Frederick City Transit bus system utilized several former Frederick County Public School buses fitted with rear exit doors. These buses were numbered 101 and 102 and painted white. 

Frederick City's first new bus order consisted of 1981 vintage TMC T-30 Citycruiser thirty foot buses (a license-built version of the Ontario Bus Industries (OBI) Orion I), which served the original Red and Blue Routes and were numbered 200–203. Frederick City purchased one lone Orion I thirty foot model transit coach built in 1987 (old faithful, number 204) to serve the new White Route that ran from downtown to the city's north end.

Soon after the formation of TransIT Services of Frederick County, TransIT purchased four new Orion V, thirty foot models (numbered 322–325) in 1994 to replace the original three TMC buses. The Orion V buses wear the new green over white color scheme. Due to acceptance testing delays, TransIT operated for several weeks under a combination of the original TMC/Orion I fleet and three thirty foot Flxible Metro buses on loan from Maryland MTA. The MTA buses however were suburban models and lacked a rear exit door.

In 2001, TransIT ordered five Thomas Dennis SLF-230 low-floor buses (numbered 917–921). Service was announced and expanded before the new buses arrived due to a delivery delay from the builder. Rather than delay service for 13 months, five small front engine used Spartan/Champion "Breadboxes" (re-badged, Goshen "Transette" buses) were purchased for short term use. The breadbox buses were used for the old "FLEX" routes, which supplemented the connector routes. The low-floor Thomas buses arrived in 2002 and the breadboxes stayed in service until the last ones were sold in 2010. 

Due to increase service demand, several more used Breadboxes were purchased later the same year. All of the breadboxes arrived with front entry doors and a rear wheelchair lift at the very back end of the coach. However, the first order had black banding around the windows while the second order did not.

Current fleet
In 2003, TransIT purchased seven new standard Orion V models (numbers 922–928) with an additional seven delivered in 2004 (numbered 060–066). In 2005, the old Frederick City Transit—number 204 was sold, ending the era of the Frederick City Transit blue over white colors.

In March 2010, TransIT bought six new Gillig Advantage buses that have replaced the aging 300-series acquired when TransIT formed in the early 1990s. These buses have a simplified stripe which does not slope up over the windows on to the roofline at the rear of the bus.

Two additional Gillig Advantage low floor buses arrived, purchased with federal grants, the new buses sport a different paint livery and are the first hybrid buses in the system. These buses have a battery pack on the roof and use a Cummins ISB engine.

TransIT took bids in late 2013 to replace the five SLF400 buses nearing their service life. In 2015, TransIT placed an order for five re-manufactured, Gillig Advantage all-electric buses from Complete Coach Works (CCW). The new buses are numbered 779-783 and entered revenue service on June 1, 2016.

In 2018, TransIT acquired six new hybrid buses split between two deliveries of ElDorado National E-Z Rider II buses to replace older high floor buses that were removed from service due to reliability issues or accident damage. The first batch of three buses 956-958 entered service in July 2018, while the second group 122-124 entered service in October 2018.

In late 2019, TransIT began receiving four new K7M thirty-foot buses from Chinese builder BYD. The first of these buses began testing in March, before finally entering revenue service in July. As of December 2020, all four buses, 364-367 have been accepted and are now in service replacing the last few remaining Orion V buses from the 2005 order.

A temporary bus, #959, a Champion Defender, thirty-foot bus was acquired used to make up a shortfall in the roster until new buses on order arrive in mid-2021 to begin replacing the 2010 Gillig Advances buses which are now at the end of their usable service life. These buses are being retired early due to service reliability issues.

Routes
TransIT routes are ten based, with the first digit designated to the part of the city/county the bus runs outbound to.
10 line buses operate from outside of downtown. 20 line routes run south Frederick, while 40 line buses serve the west end of the city. 50 line routes serve the west-to-southwest areas along the Jefferson Street corridor and Patrick Street sharing much of the same route as 40 line buses. 60 line routes serve the north end. 80 line routes serve the north end to the northwest side of the city including Ft. Detrick and the Yellow Springs area.

Routes that end in one (e.g. 51) run on an alternative route from their zero based counterpart. These routes began service in 2013.

One anomaly to the routing is the number 65 Walkersville Connector; so designated as an in-fill route after all available route numbers in the ten based system were in-use when the route began in 2011.

Currently there are no 30 or 70 line routes in service.

During peak hours, starting in 2014, the number 20, 40, 50, 51 and 60 buses run every half-hour. These buses are designated with a P after the route number denoting it is a peak hour, extra bus. Example, the number 50 bus may show as the 50P.

Discontinued routes
In early 1994, the Red, Blue and White routes from the Frederick City Transit were discontinued. The Red Route was replaced by the #50, the Blue Route was replaced by the #40 and the White Route was replaced by the #60.

In August 2012, Route 30 was disconnected replaced by the new 50/51 routes. Route 70, Midtown Connector was replaced by the new 60/61 route.

See also
 Maryland Transit Administration
 Washington Metropolitan Area Transit Authority

References

External links
 TransIT services home page
 Frederick MARC Train Schedule
 

Bus transportation in Maryland
Transportation in Frederick County, Maryland